The Beach Head War Cemetery near Anzio is a Commonwealth cemetery of the Second World War. It contains graves resulting mostly from Operation Shingle and subsequent military actions in Italy.

Cemetery contains 2,316 Commonwealth burials of the Second World War, 2025  of them identified, including Victoria Cross recipient, Sgt. Maurice Rogers. There is also one First World War burial which was brought from Chieti Communal Cemetery near Rome.

Cemetery was designed by British architect Louis de Soissons.

See also
 Anzio War Cemetery
 Sicily–Rome American Cemetery and Memorial
 List of cemeteries in Italy

References

External links
 

Burials in Lazio
Commonwealth War Graves Commission cemeteries in Italy
World War II operations and battles of the Italian Campaign
World War II cemeteries in Italy
Anzio